The 1988–89 Boston Celtics season was the 43rd season of the Boston Celtics in the National Basketball Association (NBA). This was the first season for Jimmy Rodgers as head coach; Rodgers had been a Celtics assistant coach prior to this season. This year's Celtics team was severely hindered by the loss of All-Star forward Larry Bird to a heel injury, which required surgery to have bone spurs removed from both heels; Bird only played just six early-season games before being lost to injury, averaging 19.3 points, 6.2 rebounds and 4.8 assists per game. Initially, Bird was expected to be back in March, but it was delayed and ultimately became a season-ending injury. 

Without Bird, the Celtics struggled and played .500 basketball, holding a 23–23 record at the All-Star break. At midseason, the team traded Danny Ainge and Brad Lohaus to the Sacramento Kings in exchange for Ed Pinckney and Joe Kleine. The results were dramatic as the Celtics, who had averaged over 60 wins per season thus far in the 1980s, fell to just 42 wins and 40 losses this season. Coming into the season, the Celtics had been the Eastern Conference's #1 seed five years in a row. This season, they were the #8 seed, clinching a playoff spot in the season's final game. 

This season included some bright spots, particularly the emergence of second-year guard Reggie Lewis, who had only been a minimal bench contributor in his rookie season of 1987–88, but showed a lot of improvement averaging 18.5 points and 1.5 steals per game, starting in 57 out of the 81 games he played this season. Lewis finished in second place in Most Improved Player voting. In addition, Kevin McHale averaged 22.5 points and 8.2 rebounds per game, and was named to the NBA All-Defensive Second Team, and selected for the 1989 NBA All-Star Game, while Robert Parish provided the team with 18.6 points, 12.5 rebounds and 1.5 blocks per game, and was named to the All-NBA Third Team, and Dennis Johnson contributed 10.0 points, 6.6 assists and 1.3 steals per game. First round draft pick Brian Shaw provided with 8.6 points and 5.8 assists per game, and was selected to the NBA All-Rookie Second Team, and Jim Paxson also contributed 8.6 points per game off the bench. The Celtics were still dangerous at the Boston Garden, posting a 32–9 home record (defeating both the Lakers and Pistons), but struggled mightily away from home, failing to record a road win over a team with a winning record.

The Celtics faced the Detroit Pistons in the postseason for the 4th time in 5 seasons, but this time much earlier, in the Eastern Conference First Round. The Pistons were heavily favored, but hope arose for a competitive series when the Celtics activated Bird for their playoff roster. However, Bird never suited for a game and the Pistons easily dispatched the Celtics in a three-game sweep. This was the first time since 1956 that the Celtics lost their opening round playoff series. The Celtics had won their previous 28 opening round playoff series dating back to 1957. The Pistons would reach the NBA Finals for the second consecutive year, and defeat the defending champion Los Angeles Lakers in four straight games, winning their first ever championship.

Draft picks

Roster

Roster Notes
 Small forward Larry Bird played 6 games but missed the majority of the season after undergoing surgery to remove bone spurs from both of his heels.

Regular season

Season standings

Record vs. opponents

Game log

Regular season

Playoffs

|- align="center" bgcolor="#ffcccc"
| 1
| April 28
| @ Detroit
| L 91–101
| Kevin McHale (27)
| Robert Parish (12)
| Brian Shaw (8)
| The Palace of Auburn Hills21,454
| 0–1
|- align="center" bgcolor="#ffcccc"
| 2
| April 30
| @ Detroit
| L 95–102
| Reggie Lewis (21)
| Kevin McHale (11)
| Lewis, Johnson (5)
| The Palace of Auburn Hills21,454
| 0–2
|- align="center" bgcolor="#ffcccc"
| 3
| May 2
| Detroit
| L 85–100
| Reggie Lewis (20)
| Joe Kleine (11)
| Brian Shaw (7)
| Boston Garden14,890
| 0–3
|-

Player statistics

Season

Playoffs

Awards and records
 Robert Parish, All-NBA Third Team
 Kevin McHale, NBA All-Defensive Second Team
 Brian Shaw, NBA All-Rookie Team 2nd Team

Transactions
February 23rd 1989: Danny Ainge was traded with Brad Lohaus to Sacramento Kings for Joe Kleine & Ed Pinckney

See also
 1988–89 NBA season

References

Boston Celtics seasons
Boston Celtics
Boston Celtics
Boston Celtics
Celtics
Celtics